In the fall of 1965, A. Philip Randolph, Bayard Rustin and Dr. Martin Luther King Jr., prominent economists, allies from the labor movement, and others who had participated in the 1963 March on Washington began working on what they called "A Freedom Budget For All Americans". Writing 50 years later in The Nation, John Nichols listed as its goals "the abolition of poverty, guaranteed full employment, fair prices for farmers, fair wages for workers, housing and healthcare for all, the establishment of progressive tax, and fiscal policies that respected the needs of working families." Randolph worked with Bayard Rustin and King on the Freedom Budget document. He was determined to win the "full and final triumph of the civil rights movement, to be achieved by going beyond civil rights, linking the goal of racial justice with the goal of economic justice for all people in the United States" and doing so "by rallying massive segments of the 99% of the American people in a powerfully democratic and moral crusade." 

Rustin, the architect of the Freedom Budget, was equally convinced that racial equality would not be achieved unless it was united with the pursuit of economic equality. He spoke of the need for a “program of racial equality” that was “so intertwined with progressive economic and social policies as to make it impossible to choose one without the other." This conviction motivated Rustin to develop the Freedom Budget. Rustin found it encouraging that President Lyndon Johnson seemed willing to connect racial equality to a broader progressive agenda of social and economic policies. In a commencement address at Howard University in June 1965, Johnson denounced the economic disparities between white and Black Americans and promised to fight against this “inherited gateless poverty.” 

Randolph and Rustin’s first public mention of the concept of a Freedom Budget was in November 1965 at a planning meeting for the White House Conference on Civil Rights. They envisioned that the Freedom Budget would be much larger than Johnson's Great Society agenda, to the point that members of Johnson's administration were concerned that the Freedom Budget would upstage Johnson's own initiatives. The idea of a Freedom Budget gained traction from the press, and over the next several months, Rustin worked to curry support from civil rights leadership, labor organizations, liberal groups, and church organizations. He also sought input from economists and social scientists.

Rustin unveiled the Freedom Budget in October 1966 to favorable press coverage and a positive public reception. He disseminated pamphlets written in an approachable style to gain the support of the American middle and working classes. In doing so, he sought to alleviate their concerns that a fight against poverty would negatively impact their own financial wellbeing. In addition, he lobbied extensively for the Freedom Budget, traveling the country on a speaking tour and organizing a two-pronged crusade to gain support from influential figures while mobilizing grassroots activism. 

Despite Rustin’s efforts, the Freedom Budget failed. Multiple factors contributed to this failure. The significant Republican gains in the 1966 midterm elections challenged Rustin’s hopes for the formation of a progressive coalition. Additionally, by this point, white activists’ focus was shifting to the Vietnam War as antiwar sentiment took hold. Rustin had crafted the Freedom Budget so that it would not require a decrease in defense spending. He did this to demonstrate that fighting in Vietnam and fighting against poverty were not mutually exclusive. However, economist Seymour Melman denounced the Freedom Budget as “a war budget,” and other critics rejected it on the grounds that it seemed to give tacit approval to the war in Vietnam. 

Though the Freedom Budget failed, its policy proposals influenced King's later economic justice efforts. The Freedom Budget had proposed a job guarantee for everyone ready and willing to work, a guaranteed income for those unable to work or those who should not be working, and a living wage to lift the working poor out of poverty. These policies provided the cornerstones for King's Poor People's Campaign.

References

Budgets
Civil rights movement
1965 in economics
1965 in the United States
1965 documents